Scott Rand (born 4 July 1975) is an English former professional darts player who played in Professional Darts Corporation events.

Career
Rand joined the PDC in April 2010, and within a month qualified for the UK Open. He defeated Andy Murray and Jyhan Artut before losing to Tony Broughton in the last 96.

In May 2011, he reached the semi-finals of a Players Championship in Crawley. This result helped him to qualify for the 2011 World Matchplay, where he lost 6–10 to Wayne Jones in the first round.

Rand qualified for the 2011 Players Championship Finals in Doncaster. He beat Jamie Caven 6–2 in the first round, five-time World champion Raymond van Barneveld 8–6 in the second round, and multiple major winner James Wade 9–5 in the quarter-final. In the semi-final, he led eventual champion Kevin Painter 9–6 and had two darts at double-16 for the match, but left both of them on the wire as Painter came back to win. Nevertheless, his performance left him with a cheque for £15,000 and on the cusp of a place in the top 32.

2012
Rand enjoyed the perfect debut at the PDC World Championship in 2012 as he beat Andy Smith 3–0, without dropping a leg. He played Colin Lloyd in the second round and was beaten 1–4. In April, he earned a place in the European Tour Event 1 in Vienna by defeating Keith Stephen and Nigel Heydon in the UK qualifier. He played Gary Anderson in the first round and lost 4–6. Rand reached the last 64 of the UK Open where he lost 6–9 to Andy Smith. He also qualified for the third European Tour Event with wins over John Henderson and Paul Rowley, and then received a bye through to the second round of the event in Düsseldorf due to Gary Anderson withdrawing. There he played Richie Burnett and lost 3–6. At the fifth European Tour Event, the Dutch Darts Masters, Rand saw off Lloyd 6–3 in the first round, before being whitewashed 0–6 by Andy Smith in round two.

2013

Rand qualified for the 2013 World Championship by finishing 37th on the 2012 ProTour Order of Merit, claiming the seventh of sixteen spots that were awarded to non-qualified players. He played the runner-up of the previous major, the Players Championship Finals, Kim Huybrechts in the first round and came back from 2–1 down in sets to triumph 3–2 in a high quality match. Rand played Wes Newton in the next round and was beaten 4–0. He lost 9–7 to John Henderson in the third round of the UK Open. Rand reached his first semi-final on the Pro Tour in almost a year in September at the eighth Players Championship which was undoubtedly highlighted with a 6–2 win against Michael van Gerwen in the second round. However, he was whitewashed 6–0 in the semis by Simon Whitlock as he averaged just 78.57. Rand missed out on qualifying for the 2014 World Championship by just £500 on the ProTour Order of Merit.

2014
Rand played in all six of the 2014 UK Open qualifiers but couldn't win beyond the last 128 in any of them as he failed to reach the main stage of the tournament for the first time since turning professional. He reached the last 32 of two tournaments in the following months, but has not played in a PDC event since July.

Personal life
Rand worked as a lorry driver before turning professional.

World Championship results

PDC

 2012: Second round (lost to Colin Lloyd 1–4)
 2013: Second round (lost to Wes Newton 0–4)

References

External links

1975 births
Living people
English darts players
Sportspeople from Coventry
Professional Darts Corporation former tour card holders